Gampaha may refer to:

 Gampaha, a city in western Sri Lanka in Gampaha District, Western Province
 Gampaha, Uva, a town in south eastern Sri Lanka in Badulla District, Uva Province
 Gampaha District, an administrative district of Sri Lanka
 Gampaha Electoral District, a multi-member electoral district of Sri Lanka